Frank Jay Boyd  (April 2, 1868 – December 16, 1937) was a professional baseball catcher who played for the  Cleveland Spiders of the National League in May, 1893. His minor league career lasted through 1901.

External links

1868 births
1937 deaths
19th-century baseball players
Baseball players from Pennsylvania
Major League Baseball catchers
Elmira Gladiators players
Buffalo Bisons (minor league) players
Springfield Ponies players
Franklin Braves players
Detroit Tigers (Western League) players
Rochester Blackbirds players
Scranton Red Sox players
Rochester Patriots players
Ottawa Wanderers players
Bristol Bell Makers players
Hartford Indians players
Wheeling Stogies players